Harald Friedrich Hans Volker Sigmar Uhlig (born April 26, 1961)  is a German macroeconomist and the Bruce Allen and Barbara Ritzenthaler Professor of Economics at the University of Chicago, where he was the chairman of the Department of Economics from 2009 to 2012.

Education
Uhlig received his Diplom in mathematics from the Technical University of Berlin in 1985 and earned a doctoral degree in economics at the University of Minnesota in 1990. His Ph.D. thesis, titled "Costly Information Acquisition, Stock Prices and Neoclassical Growth", was supervised by Christopher A. Sims.

Career
Uhlig has held positions at Princeton University, 1990–1994, Tilburg University (1994–2000) and Humboldt University of Berlin (2000–2007). He has also been a consultant for both the Federal Reserve Bank of Chicago and the European Central Bank.

Uhlig was co-editor of Econometrica from 2006 to 2010. He was a co-editor of the Journal of Political Economy from 2012 to 2021. He was also its lead editor from 2013 to 2021.

Controversy 
In June 2020, using Twitter, Uhlig criticized Black Lives Matter and compared people who supported it to "flat-earthers and creationists", claiming lack of scientific evidence that supports the movement, causing controversy, covered in The New York Times. Shortly thereafter, allegations of discriminatory conduct in the classroom surfaced. He was temporarily placed on leave as editor at the Journal of Political Economy "pending a determination of the Board as to whether it would be appropriate for him to continue in that role given recent accusations of discriminatory conduct in a University classroom setting." He was reinstated after a finding that "there is not a basis for a further investigation or disciplinary proceeding". His term as lead editor ended in Summer 2021. His ties to the Chicago Federal Reserve remain severed.

Awards and distinctions
In 2017, it was announced that Uhlig was named an Honorary Professor at Henan University in China.
In 2013, Uhlig was appointed Duisenberg Fellow at the European Central Bank.
In December 2005, Uhlig received the Frank P. Ramsey Prize for the best paper in Macroeconomic Dynamics, for the article "The Sharpe Ratio and Preferences: A Parametric Approach," with Martin Lettau.
In December 2003, he was elected Fellow of the Econometric Society.
In 2003, Uhlig won the Gossen Prize for his contributions to the theory and methods of dynamic macroeconomic models.

Selected publications

References

External links
 Website at the Humboldt University Berlin
 Uhlig's Blog "Makro und mehr" (German)

1961 births
20th-century  German economists
21st-century  German economists
Critics of Black Lives Matter
Economics journal editors
Fellows of the Econometric Society
Living people
Neoclassical economists
Technical University of Berlin alumni
University of Chicago faculty
University of Minnesota College of Liberal Arts alumni
Journal of Political Economy editors